In category theory, an abstract branch of mathematics, a dominant functor is a functor F : C → D in which every object of D is a retract of an object of the form F(x) for some object X of C.

References

Functors